Jana is a 2004 Indian Tamil-language action film directed by Shaji Kailas. The film's score was composed by C. Raja Mani and soundtrack was composed by Dhina, while Rajeev Ravi was the cinematographer.

Plot
Janarthanan "Jana" lives in a village in Tamil Nadu, and leading a life incognito, taking up the cause of the villagers, and making enemies around. Due to unforeseen circumstances, Jana's past is revealed as a terror to the Mumbai dons and corrupt politicians. At the present, Jana finally meets his rival Bhandari, who is released from prison to have his final round with him.

Cast

 Ajith Kumar as Janardhanan "Jana"
 Siddique as Bhandari 
 Manoj K. Jayan as ACP Rajasekar, Jana's brother
 Raghuvaran as Jana's father
 Sneha as Manimegalai
 Srividya as Jana's mother
 Sathyapriya as Mahalakshmi, Manimegalai's mother
 Bindu Panicker as Jana's sister
 Vijayan as Salim Bhai
 Ilavarasu as Jana's brother-in-law
 Latha as Jana's aunt
 Manivannan as Manimegalai's uncle
 Sindhu as Deivanai, Manimegalai's aunt
 Manorama as Manimegalai's grandmother
 Karunas as Tappa
 Baburaj as Chinnapandi
 Radharavi as Sankarapandi
 Vinu Chakravarthy as MLA
 Rajan P. Dev as Minister
 Delhi Ganesh as Saminathan
 Ponnambalam as Police inspector
 Riyaz Khan as Bhandari's brother
 Vaiyapuri as Jana's servant
 Thyagu as Balu, School attender
 Sukran
 Sampath Ram
 Subair as Commissioner Menon

Production
The film was announced in early 2002 titled as Thiruda. Trisha Krishnan was initially signed on to play the lead female role but pulled out due to unavailability of dates. The title was subsequently changed to Jana after the lead character and Ajith began filming in December 2002. Trisha's role was later taken by Sneha.

The shooting took place at Palghat where some sets were erected. It was a lavish set costing 9 lakh, consisting of two big bungalows, one belonging to Raghuvaran and the other to Radharavi, in the film. Most of the story has taken place in these bungalows. Among those present were hero Ajit and heroine Sneha. The sets have been designed by art-director Maniraj. Apart from Palghat, a 20-day schedule took place at locations like Ottappalam, and Shornoor in Kerala.

Soundtrack

The soundtrack features 6 songs composed by Dhina.

Release and reception
Jana  was released on 1 May 2004 and received mixed reviews from critics. 

Visual Dasan of Kalki called it "a comforting victory film" for Ajith. Indiaglitz called it "a complete rehash of Rajini starrer Baasha" and that it "is completely out of sorts movie". Behindwoods wrote "Jana is nothing new except a different on screen looks of Ajith." Sify wrote "Neither great nor ghastly Jana packs in a sting but ends with a whimper and is strictly for the no-holds barred Ajith addicts."

References

External links
 

2004 films
2000s Tamil-language films
2000s masala films
Indian action films
Films about organised crime in India
Films shot in Kerala
Films shot in Palakkad
Films shot in Ottapalam
Films shot in Mumbai
2004 action films
Films directed by Shaji Kailas